Anthony Highmore (1719–1799) was an English draughtsman.

Life
He was the only son of Joseph Highmore, known for five views of Hampton Court, engraved by John Tinney. He was deaf, and resided mostly at Canterbury, where he studied theology. He died on 3 October 1799, in his eighty-first year.

Family
Highmore married early in life Anna Maria, daughter of the Rev. Seth Ellis of Brampton, Derbyshire. They had fifteen children, one of whom was Anthony Highmore the legal writer.

Notes

External links

Attribution

1719 births
1799 deaths
British draughtsmen